The Motorcycle Hall of Fame has inducted the following people as honorees:

References

American Motorcyclist Association
Motorcycle Hall of Fame